Caieiras is a train station on CPTM Line 7-Ruby, located in Caieiras.

History
The station was opened by São Paulo Railway on 1 July 1883, being built to attend the district of Franco da Rocha, which was growing due to the arrival of industries.

Currently, Caieiras is operated by CPTM, after going through many administrations, public and private. It still keeps the same building from 19th century.

The station is also certified as a historical site by CONDEPHAAT.

References

Companhia Paulista de Trens Metropolitanos stations
Railway stations opened in 1883